Michael Campanella "Campy" Russell (born January 12, 1952) is an American former professional basketball player. He played the forward position in the National Basketball Association (NBA) for the Cleveland Cavaliers and New York Knicks for nine years (1975–1982, 1985) and played in the 1979 NBA All-Star Game.

Before joining the NBA, Russell was a star player at the University of Michigan. Russell played three seasons at Michigan, and in his junior year he averaged 23.7 points per game. He was named an All American that year.

During his All Star season in the NBA in 1978–1979, Russell averaged 21.9 points, 6.8 rebounds and 4.7 assists per game for the Cavaliers.

Today, Russell works in the Cavaliers' front office as Director of Alumni Relations. He is also a co-host of the Cavaliers' pregame and postgame show (Cavaliers Live, alongside Jeff Phelps) on Bally Sports Ohio. On March 26, 2022, Russell was honored with a spot on the Cavaliers Wall of Honor along with former players World B. Free and Lenny Wilkens and former owner Gordon Gund.

NBA career statistics

Regular season 

|-
| style="text-align:left;"| 
| style="text-align:left;"|Cleveland
| 68 ||  || 11.1 || .411 || – || .752 || 2.2 || .7 || .3 || .0 || 6.2
|-
| style="text-align:left;"| 
| style="text-align:left;"|Cleveland
| 82 ||  || 23.9 || .482 || – || .773 || 4.2 || 1.3 || .8 || .1 || 15.0
|-
| style="text-align:left;"| 
| style="text-align:left;"|Cleveland
| 70 ||  || 30.1 || .434 || – || .778 || 6.0 || 2.7 || 1.0 || .3 || 16.5
|-
| style="text-align:left;"| 
| style="text-align:left;"|Cleveland
| 72 ||  || 35.0 || .448 || – || .751 || 6.4 || 3.9 || 1.2 || .2 || 19.4
|-
| style="text-align:left;"| 
| style="text-align:left;"|Cleveland
| 74 ||  || 38.6 || .476 || – || .797 || 6.8 || 4.7 || 1.3 || .3 || 21.9
|-
| style="text-align:left;"| 
| style="text-align:left;"|Cleveland
| 41 ||  || 32.5 || .451 || .111 || .745 || 5.5 || 4.2 || 1.8 || .5 || 18.2
|-
| style="text-align:left;"| 
| style="text-align:left;"|New York
| 79 ||  || 36.3 || .464 || .308 || .781 || 4.5 || 3.3 || 1.3 || .1 || 16.4
|-
| style="text-align:left;"| 
| style="text-align:left;"|New York
| 77 || 63 || 30.6 || .478 || .439 || .776 || 3.1 || 3.7 || 1.0 || .2 || 13.9
|-
| style="text-align:left;"| 
| style="text-align:left;"|Cleveland
| 3 || 0 || 8.0 || .286 || .000 || .667 || 1.7 || 1.0 || .0 || .0 || 2.0
|- class="sortbottom"
| style="text-align:center;" colspan="2"| Career
| 566 || 63 || 29.6 || .459 || .366 || .772 || 4.8 || 3.0 || 1.0 || .2 || 15.8
|- class="sortbottom"
| style="text-align:center;" colspan="2"| All-Star
| 1 || 0 || 13.0 || .250 || – || – || 1.0 || .0 || .0 || .0 || 4.0

Playoffs 

|-
|style="text-align:left;"|1976
|style="text-align:left;”|Cleveland
|13||||25.2||.404||–||.855||5.5||1.1||.6||.5||13.6
|-
|style="text-align:left;"|1977
|style="text-align:left;”|Cleveland
|3|| ||33.3||.389||–||.733||8.7||3.3||1.0||.3||17.7
|-
|style="text-align:left;"|1978
|style="text-align:left;”|Cleveland
|2|| ||44.0||.487||–||.810||7.5||5.5||1.5||.5||27.5
|-
|style="text-align:left;"|1981
|style="text-align:left;”|New York
|2|| ||44.5||.441||.000||.941||4.5||4.5||2.0||.5||23.0
|- class="sortbottom"
| style="text-align:center;" colspan="2"| Career
| 20 || || 30.3 || .417 || .000 || .843 || 6.1 || 2.2 || .9 || .5 || 16.6

See also
 University of Michigan Athletic Hall of Honor

References

External links
 Basketball-reference.com Campy Russell's bio and stats

1952 births
Living people
African-American basketball players
All-American college men's basketball players
American men's basketball players
Basketball players from Tennessee
Cleveland Cavaliers announcers
Cleveland Cavaliers draft picks
Cleveland Cavaliers players
Detroit Spirits players
Michigan Wolverines men's basketball players
National Basketball Association All-Stars
New York Knicks players
Parade High School All-Americans (boys' basketball)
People from Jackson, Tennessee
Small forwards
Sportspeople from Shaker Heights, Ohio
21st-century African-American people
20th-century African-American sportspeople